FamilyTV is a television broadcast network in New Zealand.

External links
Official Website

Television stations in New Zealand